Cheilotoma fulvicollis is a species of leaf beetles in the subfamily Cryptocephalinae that is endemic to Syria.

References

External links
Trusted archives of scholarship JSTOR

Clytrini
Beetles described in 1913
Endemic fauna of Syria
Taxa named by Johan Reinhold Sahlberg